was the eldest son of Oda Nobuhide. After Nobuhiro's father took Anjo Castle in Mikawa Province in 1540, the castle was given to Nobuhiro. During 1551, Nobuhiro was trapped by the Imagawa clan, but was saved when Oda Nobunaga handed over one of their hostages—Matsudaira Takechiyo to make up for not lifting the siege of Anjō.

As an illegitimate son of Oda Nobuhide, Nobuhiro's power would slowly fade and always be looked down upon by his younger brother Nobunaga and even by many of his own retainers. Afterwards, Nobuhiro was forced to step down as the head of the Oda clan to allow Nobunaga to be the new head. 

Later on, Nobuhiro plotted against Nobunaga with the assistance of Saitō Yoshitatsu of Mino Province. Their scheme was uncovered before any damage was brought upon anyone, and Nobunaga forgave Nobuhiro. Nobuhiro was killed later on October 13, 1574, while fighting the Nagashima monto.

Family
Father: Oda Nobuhide (1510–1551)
Brothers
Oda Nobunaga (1534–1582)
Oda Nobuyuki (1536–1557)
Oda Nobukane (1548–1614)
Oda Nagamasu (1548–1622)
Oda Nobuharu (1549–1570)
Oda Nobutoki (died 1556)
Oda Nobuoki (died 1569)
Oda Hidetaka (died 1555)
Oda Hidenari
Oda Nobuteru
Oda Nagatoshi
Sisters:
Oichi (1547–1583)
Oinu

References 

1574 deaths
Samurai
Japanese warriors killed in battle
Oda clan
Year of birth unknown